Everard is a given name and surname which is the anglicised version of the old Germanic name Eberhard. Notable people with the name include:

People

First name
Everard Aloysius Lisle Phillipps (1835–1857), English East India officer awarded the Victoria Cross
Everard Calthrop (1857–1927), British railway engineer and inventor
Everard Charles Cotes (1862—1944), British entomologist
Everard Digby (disambiguation)
Everard Hambro (1842–1925), British banker
Everard Home (1756–1832), British physician
Everard of Calne (fl 1121–1145), Bishop of Norwich
Everard, Bishop of Nyitra (fl. 1183–1198), Hungarian prelate
Everard 't Serclaes (c. 1320–1388), Brabantine patriot

Last name
Charles George Everard (1794–1876), pioneer farmer and politician in South Australia
Harriett Everard (1844–1882), English singer and actress
John Everard (disambiguation)
Mathias Everard (died 1857), British major-general
Sarah Everard (1987–2021), British marketing executive who went missing and was found dead 
Thomas Everard (disambiguation)
William Everard (disambiguation)

Fictional characters 
 Professor Everard, British wizard and former headmaster of Hogwarts School of Witchcraft and Wizardry in the Harry Potter fictional universe.
 Captain Everard, from Henry James' novella In the Cage.
 Everard, an imaginary friend used by English comedian Larry Grayson in his stand-up act.
 Everard Webley, from Aldous Huxley's novel Point Counter Point.

See also
 Everard baronets
 Everard Central, South Australia, a locality
 Hundred of Everard, South Australia, a cadastral unit

Surnames from given names